The 2004 Parramatta Eels season was the 58th in the club's history. Coached by Brian Smith and captained by Nathan Cayless, they competed in the National Rugby League's 2004 Telstra Premiership.

Summary
The 2004 NRL season was the worst in some time for the Parramatta club. After only managing nine wins in 24 games, the Parramatta side finished 12th and missed out on the Finals for the second year running. The highlight of the season was defeating Manly 52-12 in round 14 of the competition.

Standings

Awards
Michael Cronin clubman of the year award: Michael Vella
Ken Thornett Medal (Players' player): Nathan Hindmarsh
Jack Gibson Award (Coach's award): Wade McKinnon
Eric Grothe Rookie of the Year Award: Jack Afamasaga

References

Parramatta Eels seasons
Parramatta Eels season